The mixed relay Biathlon World Championships was held in Khanty-Mansiysk, Russia on 28 March 2010. As for the rules of biathlon in the year of the Winter Olympic Games World Championships being played only in disciplines not included in the Olympic program, therefore the championship consists only of the mixed relay. Contested since 2005, mixed relay is the most recently introduced event at the Championships, this was the 6th  and last competition as the mixed event was included at the Olympic Program at the 2014 Winter Olympics.

Mixed relay 
The following are the results of the event.

External links 
Results

2010 in Russian sport
2010 in biathlon
2010
International sports competitions hosted by Russia
Sport in Khanty-Mansiysk
Biathlon competitions in Russia
March 2010 sports events in Russia